al-Abbās ibn Ibrāhīm as-Samlālī al-Marrākshī (1877 – 1959) was a Moroccan historian, faqih, and judge from Marrakesh. He is notable for his book Information About the Notables of Marrakesh and Aghmat.

Biography 
He received his education at mosques and Quranic schools in Marrakesh. He began his career as an instructor at the Riad al-'Arūs Mosque. He was then promoted to the third rank of Islamic scholars in Marrakesh. After the Hafidiya, he became a secretary in the office of the Prime Minister of Marrakesh. He served Sultan Abd al-Hafid in Fes, and this period is recognized as a time of prolific writing for the historian.

After the Treaty of Fes and the inception of the French Protectorate, he returned to teaching in Marrakesh, also working in Islamic opinion and notary work. He moved to Rabat when he was appointed a judge in the court of appeals. He was then made a judge in Settat and Jadida. He was then made a judge in Marrakesh where he worked until his retirement shortly before his death in 1959.

Works

Information About the Notables of Marrakesh and Aghmat
Information About the Notables of Marrakesh and Aghmat is considered an important history encyclopedia. In writing it, he relied on both printed sources and manuscripts.

Other works 
Although he is noted for his history book Information About the Notables of Marrakesh and Aghmat, he also published in the fields of fiqh, hadith, and literature.

References 

20th-century Moroccan historians
20th-century Moroccan judges
People from Marrakesh
1877 births
1959 deaths